Okemos Public Schools, originally established in 1849, now represents a  area

In 2005-06, the district enrolled 4,210 students and employed 298 teachers, 19 administrators, and 233 support personnel.

In 2009, the Okemos school board decided, to reorganize the district's elementary and middle schools. One key objective was to close budget deficits resulting from lagging tax revenues and declining enrolments. Improvements sought to consolidate teaching to a few schools, allowing for more specialization among teachers at each grade level.

In 2010, Wardcliff and Edgewood Elementary Schools closed. Kindergarten to 4th grade students from Wardcliff and Central were reassigned to Cornell, Bennett Woods, and Hiawatha; and the public Montessori program moved to Central from Edgewood.

All 5th and 6th graders now attend Kinawa Middle School, with all 7th and 8th graders now attending Chippewa Middle School. Edgewood is now home to Okemos Community Education, which also houses their Childcare Program and Pre-School Program.

Okemos Public Schools is ranked as the #6 best school district in Michigan by Niche as of 2022.

Attendance area
The school district includes approximately two-thirds of Meridian Township, Michigan and portions of Alaiedon and Williamstown townships. It includes most of Okemos, as well as portions of Lansing, Haslett, and East Lansing.

Schools

Okemos Public Schools is made up of four elementary schools, one [5-6] building, one [7-8] building and one high school.

Bennett Woods Elementary
Cornell Elementary
Okemos Public Montessori at Central
Hiawatha Elementary
Chippewa 7-8 School
Kinawa 5-6 School
Okemos High School

References

External links
 Okemos Public Schools Website

East Lansing, Michigan
Lansing, Michigan
School districts in Michigan
1849 establishments in Michigan
Education in Ingham County, Michigan
School districts established in 1849